Grammitidoideae is a subfamily of the fern family Polypodiaceae, whose members are informally known as grammitids. It comprises a clade of about 750 species. They are distributed over higher elevations in both the Old and New World.  This group was previously treated as a separate family, Grammitidaceae until molecular phylogenies showed it to be nested within the Polypodiaceae. It has since been treated as an unranked clade within subfamily Polypodioideae (renamed tribe Polypodieae in one classification), and, most recently, as a separate subfamily (reducing Polypodioideae to an evolutionary grade).

Circumscription
In 2011, Christenhusz et al. placed the grammitid ferns in the subfamily Polypodioideae, within the Polypodiaceae, as an informal group without rank. In 2014, Christenhusz and Chase expanded the circumscription of both family and subfamily, placing the Polypodioideae as previously delimited, including grammitids, in tribe Polypodieae. The PPG I classification of 2016 largely reverted to the 2011 circumscriptions of these groups, but placed the grammitids in a new subfamily.

The following phylogram shows a likely relationship between grammitid ferns and the Polypodiaceae subfamilies, based on Schuettpelz & Pryer, 2008, with PPG I subfamilies shown.

Genera
The Pteridophyte Phylogeny Group classification of 2016 (PPG I) recognizes the following genera:

 Acrosorus Copel. – Southeastern Asia
 Adenophorus Gaudich. – Hawaii)
 Alansmia M.Kessler, Moguel, Sundue & Labiak – Neotropics, Africa
 Archigrammitis Parris – Malesia, Polynesia
 Ascogrammitis Sundue – Neotropics
 Calymmodon C.Presl – Southeastern Asia
 Ceradenia L.E.Bishop – mainly tropical Africa
 Chrysogrammitis Parris – Southeastern Asia
 Cochlidium Kaulf. (including Xiphopteris Kaulf.) – Neotropics, Taiwan
 Ctenopterella Parris – Southeastern Asia, Australia
 Dasygrammitis Parris – Southeastern Asia
 Enterosora Baker – Neotropics, Madagascar
 Galactodenia Sundue & Labiak – Neotropics
 Grammitis Sw. – Neotropics
 Lellingeria A.R.Sm. & R.C.Moran – Neotropics
 Leucotrichum Labiak – Neotropics, Madagascar
 Lomaphlebia J.Sm.
 Luisma M.T.Murillo & A.R.Sm. – Colombia
 Melpomene A.R.Sm. & R.C.Moran – Neotropics
 Micropolypodium Hayata – China, Japan
 Moranopteris R.Y.Hirai & J.Prado – Neotropics
 Mycopteris Sundue – Neotropics
 Notogrammitis Parris – Australia, New Zealand
 Oreogrammitis Copeland – Southeastern Asia, Australia, Pacific islands, China, Philippines
 Prosaptia C.Presl (including Ctenopteris Blume ex Kunze) – Southeastern Asia
 Radiogrammitis Parris – Southeastern Asia, Pacific islands; sunk into Oreogrammitis in 2020
 Scleroglossum Alderwerelt (including Nematopteris Alderw.) – Southeastern Asia, Pacific islands
 Stenogrammitis Labiak – Neotropics, Africa, Pacific islands
 Terpsichore A.R.Sm. – Neotropics
 Themelium (T.Moore) Parris – China, Philippines, Thailand; sunk into Oreogrammitis in 2020
 Tomophyllum (E.Fournier) Parris – China, Inda, Nepal
 Xiphopterella Parris – China
 Zygophlebia L.E.Bishop – Neotropics, Madagascar; sunk into Enterosora in 2019

References

Plant subfamilies